Jorge Victor Ahumada (born 1946) is a former professional boxer. Notable fights include four bouts with Víctor Galíndez (one of which was a world title challenge at the Madison Square Garden in New York, New York), a title bout with Bob Foster (Foster's last title defense) which ended in a draw, and a bout with John Conteh for the WBC Light Heavyweight Championship.

References

External links
 

1946 births
Living people
Argentine male boxers
Sportspeople from Mendoza Province
Boxers at the 1967 Pan American Games
Pan American Games gold medalists for Argentina
Pan American Games medalists in boxing
Middleweight boxers
Medalists at the 1967 Pan American Games